Ronald Brian Underwood (born November 6, 1953) is an American film and television director, known for directing such films as Tremors (1990), City Slickers (1991), Heart and Souls (1993), and Mighty Joe Young (1998).

Early life
Underwood was born November 6, 1953, in Glendale, California. In school he lived in Ceylon, now Sri Lanka, as an AFS Intercultural Programs exchange student. After graduating from high school, he briefly attended Occidental College as a pre-med student, but transferred to the USC School of Cinema (now USC School of Cinematic Arts) after deciding to become a filmmaker.  Underwood majored in cinema with a minor in anthropology.

Film career

Early career (1976–1989)
Upon completion of his fellowship at the American Film Institute, Underwood began working as a staff director for Barr films, a company specializing in the production of educational films.  Underwood directed over one hundred short films, including an adaptation of the Kurt Vonnegut short story, "Deer in the Works", starring Dennis Dugan.  While directing and producing short films for the educational market, Underwood pursued work in the motion picture industry.  One of the first movies Underwood worked on was Futureworld (1976) as a production assistant. The film starred Blythe Danner and Peter Fonda, actors he would later direct in 2004.  During the filming of Futureworld, one of his tasks was to babysit a young Gwyneth Paltrow while her mother, Ms. Danner, was shooting.  Soon after Underwood served as the location manager on the Peter Hyams directed motion picture, Capricorn One (1978).  Another early job was acting as assistant director to first-time director David Schmoeller on Tourist Trap, a low-budget horror film. After this he continued to direct and produce educational films and children's television for the next several years. In 1986 Underwood established himself as a director when his live action/stop motion film adaptation of Beverly Cleary's The Mouse and the Motorcycle won a Peabody Award, which was followed two years later by the sequel Runaway Ralph, for which he received a Daytime Emmy nomination.

Mainstream breakthrough (1990–present)
Following his critically acclaimed venture into television, Underwood moved into directing feature films. His first effort was Tremors starring Kevin Bacon, Fred Ward, Michael Gross, and Reba McEntire in her acting debut. Written and produced by his friends Brent Maddock & S. S. Wilson, it was released by Universal Studios in 1990. The film was well received by the critics and later established itself as a cult classic.

Underwood received his first taste of commercial success with 1991's City Slickers, which starred Billy Crystal, Daniel Stern and Jack Palance, who won an Academy Award for his performance. The film made $179m worldwide with a budget of only $27m. It was the tenth most successful film released in 1991 (the fifth most successful in the US). His next film, also written by Maddock & Wilson, Heart and Souls (1993), was again well-received by critics but struggled at the box office (making a total of $16m in the US). It starred Robert Downey, Jr., Alfre Woodard, Kyra Sedgwick, Charles Grodin, Tom Sizemore, Elisabeth Shue and David Paymer.  He followed this with Speechless (1994), written by Robert King and starring Michael Keaton and Geena Davis.

Given the opportunity to direct a big-budget film by Walt Disney Pictures in 1998, he was asked to direct Mighty Joe Young, a remake of the 1949 RKO film. The film, starring Charlize Theron in her first lead role, was nominated for the Academy Award for Visual Effects and featured some of the most sophisticated special effects seen in film up to that point, paving the way for later ape films like Peter Jackson's King Kong (2005). The special effects drove production costs to around $90m.

Following Mighty Joe Young, Underwood began work on Eddie Murphy fronted The Adventures of Pluto Nash. The film also starred Rosario Dawson and was filmed in Montreal, Canada.  Unfortunately for Underwood, the film was greeted with universally poor reception, and proved a box-office failure.

Underwood returned to his roots, directing both low-budget films and television.  He directed Stealing Sinatra (2003) for Showtime, for which William H. Macy received an Emmy nomination, Back When We Were Grownups (2004) based on the Anne Tyler novel which garnered star Blythe Danner a nomination for an Emmy, and In the Mix (2005), starring R&B singer Usher, Chazz Palminteri and Emmanuelle Chriqui for Lions Gate Entertainment.  He has directed many episodic television dramas, including episodes of Monk, Boston Legal, Ugly Betty, Heroes, Grey's Anatomy, Burn Notice, Once Upon a Time, Desperate Housewives, Nashville, Scandal, Agents of S.H.I.E.L.D., The Good Fight, Fear the Walking Dead,  Evil and Big Shot.

Filmography

Films
Director
 Deer in the Works (1980) (Short Film)
 Tremors (1990) (Also story writer)
 City Slickers (1991)
 Heart and Souls (1993)
 Speechless (1994)
 Mighty Joe Young (1998)
 The Adventures of Pluto Nash (2002)
 In the Mix (2005)

Other credits

Television

TV movies
 Stealing Sinatra (2003)
 Back When We Were Grownups (2004)
 Santa Baby (2006)
 The Year Without A Santa Claus (2006)
 Holiday in Handcuffs (2007)
 Santa Baby 2: Christmas Maybe (2009)
 Deck the Halls (2011)

TV series

Awards and nominations
Peabody Award:

1986 Peabody Award ("ABC Weekend Specials", "The Mouse and the Motorcycle")

Daytime Emmy Awards:

1987: Special Class Directing (ABC Weekend Specials, "Runaway Ralph" nominated)

Saturn Award:

1994: Best Director (Heart and Souls, nominated)

Golden Raspberry Awards:

2003: Worst Director (The Adventures of Pluto Nash, nominated)

Directors Guild of America Award:

2007: Outstanding Directorial Achievement in Children's Programs (The Year Without a Santa Claus, nominated)

References

External links
Ron Underwood website

1953 births
American television directors
Living people
People from Glendale, California
USC School of Cinematic Arts alumni
Film directors from California
Occidental College alumni
Film producers from California
Comedy film directors